The history of Venezuela reflects events in areas of the Americas colonized by Spain starting 1502; amid resistance from indigenous peoples, led by Native caciques, such as Guaicaipuro and Tamanaco. However, in the Andean region of western Venezuela, complex Andean civilization of the Timoto-Cuica people flourished before European contact. 

After the first contacts between Europeans, specifically Portuguese and Spanish conquerors, there was no several event which produced a reaction between 1515-1528, the biggest event that happened after 1528 was the German Colonization of Venezuela. This event occurred because of a business between Charles V and the banking family of the Augsburg. Charles V, gave the family of the Augsburg most of the territory of the Province of Venezuela, which after the concession was called by the Germans "Klein-Venedig" which means "Little Venice". The Germans in Venezuela were mostly conquistadores or explorers, which their mission was to find El Dorado. At the same time, the German explorers and conquistadores founded two standing cities in actuality, Maracaibo and Neu-Augsburg, which is the today's city of Coro. After the unsuccessful plan of the Germans of finding El Dorado, the Augsburg gave the concession to the Spanish crown. After this, the Spanish conquistadores continued their missions in the territory and the most representative event after the Augsburg concession was the foundation of Caracas, which was the most longstanding capital of the Province of Venezuela and the today's capital city of Venezuela. The colonial economy in the 16th and 17th centuries was centered on gold mining and livestock farming. 

Relatively few colonists employed native farmers on their estates and enslaved other native peoples and later Africans to work in the mines. The territory of Venezuela was at various times ruled by the capitals of distant New Spain and the Viceroyalty of Peru. In the 18th century, cocoa plantations grew along the coast, which were processed by further importing African slaves. Cocoa beans became Venezuela's main export, monopolized by the Guipuzcoan Company of Caracas. Most of the surviving locals had migrated south by then, where Spanish monks worked. Intellectual activity increased among the white Creole elite and was centered on the University of Caracas. The Province of Venezuela was incorporated into the Viceroyalty of New Granada in 1717 and became Captaincy General of Venezuela in 1777. In 1811, it became one of the first Spanish-American colonies to declare independence, which was not securely established until 1821, when Venezuela was a department of the federal republic of Gran Colombia. It gained full independence as a separate country in 1830. During the 19th century, Venezuela suffered political turmoil and autocracy, remaining dominated by regional caudillos (military strongmen) until the mid-20th century. 

Since 1958, Venezuela has had a series of democratic governments. However, economic shocks in the 1980s led to several political crises, including the deadly Caracazo riots of 1989, two attempted coups in 1992, and the impeachment of President Carlos Andrés Pérez in 1993. A collapse in confidence in the existing parties saw the 1998 election of former coup-involved career officer Hugo Chávez and the launch of the Bolivarian Revolution, beginning with a 1999 Constituent Assembly to write a new Constitution of Venezuela. This new constitution officially changed the name of the country to República Bolivariana de Venezuela (Bolivarian Republic of Venezuela). At the same time, the new government of Venezuela started several changes in the internal economy of the country, which resulted into a socioeconomic crisis that began during the rule of Chavez and Nicolás Maduro. The crisis is characterised by hyperinflation, escalating famine, disease, crime, and mortality, leading to massive emigration from the country.

Pre-Columbian period in Venezuela

Archaeologists have discovered evidence of the earliest known inhabitants of the Venezuelan area in the form of leaf-shaped flake tools, together with chopping and plano-convex scraping implements exposed on the high riverine terraces of the Pedregal River in western Venezuela. Late Pleistocene hunting artifacts, including spear tips, come from a similar site in northwestern Venezuela known as El Jobo. According to radiocarbon dating, these date from 15,000 to 9,000 B.P. Taima-Taima, yellow Muaco, and El Jobo in Falcón are some of the sites that have yielded archaeological material from these times. These groups co-existed with megafauna like megateriums, glyptodonts, and toxodonts.  In this period, hunters and gatherers of megafauna started to turn to other food sources and established the first tribal structures.

Pre-Columbian Venezuela had an estimated population of one million. In addition to indigenous peoples known today, the population included historic groups such as the Kalina (Caribs), Caquetio, Auaké, Mariche, and Timoto-Cuicas. The Timoto-Cuica culture was the most complex society in Pre-Columbian Venezuela; with pre-planned permanent villages, surrounded by irrigated, terraced fields and with tanks for water storage. Their houses were made primarily of stone and wood with thatched roofs. They were peaceful, for the most part, and depended on growing crops. Regional crops included potatoes and ullucos. They left behind works of art, particularly anthropomorphic ceramics, but no major monuments. They spun vegetable fibers to weave into textiles and mats for housing. They are credited with having invented the arepa, a staple of Venezuelan cuisine.

 which ends with the European Conquest and Colony period. In the 16th century, when Spanish colonization began in Venezuelan territory, the population of several indigenous peoples, such as the Mariches (descendants of the Caribes), declined. Native caciques (leaders), such as Guaicaipuro and Tamanaco, attempted to resist Spanish incursions, but the newcomers ultimately subdued them. Historians agree that the founder of Caracas, Diego de Losada, ultimately put Tamanaco to death.

Spanish rule

Christopher Columbus sailed along the eastern coast of Venezuela on his third voyage in 1498 and explored most of the today's Sucre state coast line, the only one of his four voyages to reach the South American mainland. This expedition discovered the so-called "Pearl Islands" of Cubagua and Margarita off the northeastern coast of Venezuela. Later Spanish expeditions returned to exploit these islands' abundant pearl oysters, enslaving the indigenous people of the islands and harvesting the pearls intensively. They became one of the most valuable resources of the incipient Spanish Empire in the Americas between 1508 and 1531, by which time the local indigenous population and the pearl oysters had been devastated.

The second Spanish expedition, led by Alonso de Ojeda, sailing along the length of the northern coast of South America in 1499, gave the name Venezuela ("little Venice" in Spanish) to the Gulf of Venezuela—because of its perceived similarity to the Italian city.

Spain's colonization of mainland Venezuela started in 1502. Spain established its first permanent South American settlement in what became the city of Cumaná. At the time of the Spanish arrival, indigenous people lived mainly in groups as agriculturists and hunters – along the coast, in the Andean mountain range, and along the Orinoco River.

Klein-Venedig (Little Venice) was the most significant part of the German colonization of the Americas, from 1528 to 1546, in which the Augsburg-based Welser banking family obtained colonial rights in the Province of Venezuela in return for debts owed by Charles I of Spain. The primary motivation was the search for the legendary golden city of El Dorado  . The venture was led at first by Ambrosius Ehinger, who founded Maracaibo in 1529. After the deaths of first, Ehinger, and then his successor, Georg von Speyer, Philipp von Hutten continued exploration in the interior, and in his absence from the capital of the province, the crown of Spain claimed the right to appoint the governor. Upon Hutten's return to the capital, Santa Ana de Coro, in 1546, the Spanish governor, Juan de Carvajal, had Hutten and Bartholomeus VI. Welser executed. Charles I later revoked Welser's charter.

By the middle of the 16th century, not many more than 2,000 Europeans lived in the region that became Venezuela. The opening of gold mines in 1632 at Yaracuy led to the introduction of slavery, at first involving the indigenous population, then imported Africans. The first real economic success of the colony involved the raising of livestock, much helped by the grassy plains known as Llanos. The society that developed as a result – a handful of Spanish landowners and widely dispersed native herdsmen on Spanish-introduced horses – recalls primitive feudalism, certainly a powerful concept in the 16th-century Spanish imagination that (perhaps more fruitfully) bears comparison in economic terms with the latifundia of antiquity.

During the 16th and 17th centuries, the cities that constitute today's Venezuela suffered relative neglect. The Viceroyalties of New Spain and Peru (located on the sites that had been occupied by the capital cities of the Aztecs and Incas, respectively) showed more interest in their nearby gold and silver mines than in the remote agricultural societies of Venezuela. Responsibility for the Venezuelan territories shifted to and between the two viceroyalties.

In the 18th century, a second Venezuelan society formed along the coast with the establishment of cocoa plantations manned by much larger importations of African slaves. Quite a number of black slaves also worked in the haciendas of the grassy llanos. Most of the Amerindians who still survived had perforce migrated to the plains and jungles to the south, where only Spanish friars took an interest in them – especially the Franciscans or Capucins, who compiled grammars and small lexicons for some of their languages. The most important friar misión (the name for an area of friar activity) developed in San Tomé in the Guayana Region.

The Province of Venezuela came under the jurisdiction of the Viceroyalty of New Granada (established in 1717). The Province became the Captaincy General of Venezuela in 1777.  The Compañía Guipuzcoana de Caracas held a close monopoly on trade with Europe. The Guipuzcoana company stimulated the Venezuelan economy, especially in fostering the cultivation of cacao beans, which became Venezuela's principal export. It opened Venezuelan ports to foreign commerce, but this recognized a fait accompli. Like no other Spanish American dependency, Venezuela had more contacts with Europe through the British and French islands in the Caribbean. In an almost surreptitious, though legal, manner, Caracas had become an intellectual powerhouse. From 1721, it had its own university, which taught Latin, medicine, and engineering, apart from the humanities. Its most illustrious graduate, Andrés Bello, became the greatest Spanish American polymath of his time. In Chacao, a town to the east of Caracas, there flourished a school of music whose director José Ángel Lamas produced a few but impressive compositions according with the strictest 18th-century European canons. Later on, the development of the education system is one of the reasons why distribution began to improve.

Venezuelan independence

Word of Spain's troubles in 1808 in the Napoleonic Wars soon reached Caracas, but only on 19 April 1810 did its "cabildo" (city council) decide to follow the example set by the Spanish provinces two years earlier. On 5 July 1811, seven of the ten provinces of the Captaincy General of Venezuela declared their independence in the Venezuelan Declaration of Independence. The First Republic of Venezuela was lost in 1812 following the 1812 Caracas earthquake and the Battle of La Victoria (1812). Simón Bolívar led an "Admirable Campaign" to retake Venezuela, establishing the Second Republic of Venezuela in 1813; but this did not last either, falling to a combination of a local uprising and Spanish royalist reconquest. Only as part of Bolívar's campaign to liberate New Granada in 1819–20 did Venezuela achieve a lasting independence from Spain (initially as part of Gran Colombia).

On 17 December 1819, the Congress of Angostura declared Gran Colombia an independent country. After two more years of war, the country achieved independence from Spain in 1821 under the leadership of its most famous son, Simón Bolívar. Venezuela, along with the  countries of Colombia, Panama, and Ecuador, formed part of the Republic of Gran Colombia until 1830, when Venezuela became a separate sovereign country.

The First Republic

Some Venezuelans began to grow resistant to colonial control towards the end of the eighteenth century. Spain's neglect of its Venezuelan colony contributed to Venezuelan intellectuals' increased zeal for learning. The colony had more external sources of information than other more "important" Spanish dependencies, not excluding the viceroyalties, although one should not belabor this point, for only the mantuanos (a Venezuelan name for the white Creole elite) had access to a solid education. (Another name for the mantuanos class, grandes cacaos, reflected the source of their wealth. To , in Venezuela the term can apply to a presumptuous person.) The mantuanos showed themselves presumptuous, overbearing, and zealous in affirming their privileges against the pardo (mixed-race) majority of the population.

The first organized conspiracy against the colonial regime in Venezuela occurred in 1797, organized by Manuel Gual and José María España. It took direct inspiration from the French Revolution, but was put down with the collaboration of the "mantuanos" because it promoted radical social changes.

European events sowed the seeds of Venezuela's declaration of independence. The Napoleonic Wars in Europe not only weakened Spain's imperial power but also put Britain (unofficially) on the side of the independence movement. In May 1808, Napoleon demanded and received the abdication of Ferdinand VII of Spain and the confirmation of the abdication of Ferdinand's father Charles IV. Napoleon then appointed as King of Spain his own brother Joseph Bonaparte. That marked the beginning of Spain's own War of Independence from French hegemony and partial occupation before the Spanish American wars of independence even began. The focal point of Spanish political resistance, the Supreme Central Junta, was formed to govern in the name of Ferdinand. The first major defeat that Napoleonic France suffered occurred at the Battle of Bailén in Andalusia (July 1808). Despite this Spanish victory, the French soon regained the initiative and advanced into southern Spain. The Spanish government had to retreat to the island redoubt of Cádiz. Here, the Supreme Central Junta dissolved itself and set up a five-person regency to handle the affairs of state until the deputies of the Cortes of Cádiz could convene.

Word of Spain's troubles in 1808 in the Napoleonic Wars soon reached Caracas, but only on 19 April 1810 did its "cabildo" (city council) decide to follow the example set by the Spanish provinces two years earlier. Other provincial capitals — Barcelona, Cumaná, Mérida, and Trujillo among them – followed suit. Although the new Junta of Caracas had self-appointed elite members who claimed to represent the pardos (free blacks and even slaves), the new government eventually faced the challenge of maintaining the alliance with the pardos. Given recent history these groups still had grievances against the mantuanos. A segment of the mantuanos (among them 27-year-old Simón Bolívar, the future Liberator) saw the setting up of the Junta as a step towards outright independence. On 5 July 1811, seven of the ten provinces of the Captaincy General of Venezuela declared their independence in the Venezuelan Declaration of Independence.

The Venezuelan War of Independence ensued. It ran concurrently with that of New Granada. The First Republic of Venezuela was lost in 1812 following the 1812 Caracas earthquake and the Battle of La Victoria.

The campaign of 1813 and the Second Republic

Bolívar arrived in Cartagena and was well received, as he was later in Bogotá, where he joined the army of the United Provinces of New Granada. He recruited a force and invaded Venezuela from the southwest by crossing the Andes (1813). His chief lieutenant was the headstrong José Félix Ribas. In Trujillo, an Andean province, Bolívar emitted his infamous Decree of War to the Death with which he hoped to get the pardos and any mantuano who was having second thoughts on his side. At the time that Bolívar was victorious in the west, Santiago Mariño and Manuel Piar, a pardo from the Dutch island of Curaçao, were successfully fighting royalists in eastern Venezuela. Quickly losing ground (much as Miranda had a year earlier) Monteverde took refuge in Puerto Cabello, and Bolívar occupied Caracas, re-establishing the Republic on 6 August 1813, with two "states", one in the west headed by Bolívar and one in the east headed by Mariño. But neither the successful invasions nor Bolívar's decree were provoking a massive enrollment of pardos in the cause of independence. Rather it was the other way around. In the Llanos a populist Spanish immigrant caudillo, José Tomás Boves, initiated a widespread pardo movement against the restored Republic. Bolívar and Ribas held and defended the mantuano-controlled center of Venezuela. In the east, the royalists started recovering territory. After suffering a setback, Mariño and Bolívar joined their forces, but they were defeated by Boves in 1814. Republicans were forced to evacuate Caracas and flee to the east, where, in the port of Carúpano, Piar was still holding out. Piar, however, did not accept Bolívar's supreme command, and once again Bolívar left Venezuela and went to New Granada (1815) (see Bolívar in New Granada).

Gran Colombia and Bolívar's campaign to liberate New Granada

In Spain in 1820, liberal sections of the military under Rafael del Riego established a constitutional monarchy, which precluded new Spanish invasions of America. Before his recall to Spain, Morillo signed a truce with Bolívar. Morillo left Miguel de la Torre in command of the royalist forces.

The truce ended in 1821 and in Bolívar's campaign to liberate New Granada, Bolívar had all available forces converge on Carabobo, a hilly plain near Valencia, to face de la Torre and Morales. The defeat of the Spanish right in the Battle of Carabobo, which is credited to the British Legions whose commander Thomas Farriar fell, decided the battle. The general Morales with the remnants of the royalists tried to resist in Puerto Cabello. After Carabobo, a congress met in Cúcuta, Santander's birthplace, and approved a federalist constitution for Gran Colombia. Subsequent battles included a key naval victory for the independence forces on 24 July 1823 at the Battle of Lake Maracaibo and in November 1823 José Antonio Páez occupied Puerto Cabello, the last Royalist stronghold in Venezuela.

Independence from Gran Colombia
In Venezuela, nominally a province of Gran Colombia, José Antonio Páez, backed by the former mantuanos (and now by the ruling clique in Caracas), initiated the separation of Venezuela in 1826. Bolívar returned post-haste to Bogotá, where vice-president Santander complained about Venezuelan insubordination. Bolívar traveled to Caracas and seemingly put Páez in his place (1827). Sucre left Bolivia the same year. Santander expressed disappointment, and furthermore, opposed Bolívar's plans to implant the Bolivian constitution in Great Colombia, for which a convention was convoked by Bolívar in the town of Ocaña. Thus began the rivalry between Santander and Bolívar.

In 1828, in view of the political opposition he faced, both in Venezuela and in New Granada, and because his Great Colombia had started to disintegrate, Bolívar named himself dictator. He escaped an assassination attempt with the help of his mistress, Manuela Saenz, a pardo woman from Quito. Santander was exiled, but Jose Prudencio Padilla, the pardo general who had helped corner Morales after Carabobo in the Battle of Maracaibo Lake, was executed for treason. The emboldened Peruvians invaded Guayaquil. Bolívar had to return to Quito in 1829 to repulse them, which didn't take much doing, for the invasion had petered out before Bolívar arrived. Back in Bogotá, Bolívar pleaded for unity and, though he had offered to resign various times during his career, this time, when Great Colombia had a new constitution (not Bolívar's Bolivian one) and a president, Joaquin Mosquera, Bolívar finally did resign in 1830. At that point, Páez not only had declared the second independence of Venezuela but also had promoted a campaign of vituperation against Bolívar. Seeing the state of things, Quito followed suit under Venezuelan general Juan José Flores, and Sucre was assassinated while riding alone through a thick forest on his way to that city. A downcast Bolívar rode to the coast with the intention of leaving the country, but he was exhausted and very sick. He died near Santa Marta in Colombia at the age of 47.

1830–1908

Following the Venezuelan War of Independence (part of the Spanish American wars of independence), Venezuela initially won independence from the Spanish Empire as part of Gran Colombia. Internal tensions led to the dissolution of Gran Colombia in 1830–31, with Venezuela declaring independence in 1831. For the rest of the nineteenth century, independent Venezuela saw a range of caudillos (strongmen) compete for power. Leading political figures include José Antonio Páez, Antonio Guzmán Blanco and Cipriano Castro.

In a succession of rebellions, the Federal War was particularly bloody and saw the establishment of the modern system of States of Venezuela (replacing the Provinces of Venezuela largely inherited from the colonial era). The start of the 20th century saw several notable international crises: the Venezuela Crisis of 1895 under Joaquín Crespo (a dispute with Britain over Guayana Esequiba) and the Venezuela Crisis of 1902–1903 (Venezuela's refusal to pay foreign debts) under Cipriano Castro.

1908–1958

Juan Vicente Gómez (1908 - 1935) 

In 1908, President Cipriano Castro was too sick to be cured in Venezuela and he left for Germany leaving Juan Vicente Gómez in charge. Castro had not gone further than the outer Antilles when Gómez took over the government and forbade Castro from returning. This was the beginning of a regime that lasted until 1935 and is interwoven with the early development of the oil industry, the greatest influence ever on the history of Venezuela.

One of Gómez's first measures was to start canceling outstanding Venezuelan international debts, a goal which was soon achieved. Under Gómez, Venezuela acquired all the appurtenances of a regular national army staffed and officered almost entirely by Andeans. At the time, the country had a widespread telegraphic system. Under these circumstances, the possibility of caudillo uprisings was curtailed. The only armed threat against Gómez came from a disaffected former business partner to whom he had given a monopoly on all maritime and riverine commerce.  Although there are many tales of Gómez's cruelty and ruthlessness, they are mostly exaggerations by his enemies. The man who had tried to overthrow him, Román Delgado Chalbaud, spent fourteen years in jail. He later claimed that he was in ball and chains during all that time, but he was released by Gómez. His son, Carlos Delgado Chalbaud, would later become president of Venezuela. When university students staged a street demonstration in 1928 (Generation of 1928), they were arrested but were soon released. But Gómez was indeed ruthless in throttling all opposition and he allowed a personality cult, but this was as much his doing as that of his sycophants, who were numerous all over Venezuela. Gómez, unlike Guzmán Blanco, never erected a statue of himself anywhere in Venezuela. He was a stickler for legal formalisms, which in essence meant that he introduced new constitutions any time it suited his political ends, although this was also the rule during the 19th century. During his dictatorship, Gómez appointed two figurehead presidents while he kept a tight hold on the armed forces from Maracay, his favorite city, west of Caracas, which he embellished and made the main Venezuelan garrison, a status which it retained until at least the 1960s.

The discovery of oil 

It did not take much geological expertise to know that Venezuela had large petroleum deposits, because the petroleum oozed out from seeps all over the country and an asphalt lake had formed naturally. Venezuelans themselves had tried to extract oil for a small hand-pumped refinery early in the 20th century. When word spread internationally of Venezuela's oil potential, representatives of large foreign companies came to the country and started lobbying for rights of exploration and exploitation, and Gómez established the concessionary system. Venezuela had inherited from Spain the law that the ground surface—presumably, as deep as a plow or a water well went—could belong to individuals but everything under the soil was state property. Thus, Gómez began to grant huge concessions to family and friends. Any one who was close to Gómez eventually would become rich in one way or another. Gómez himself accumulated immense expanses of grasslands for cattle-raising, which had been his original occupation and was a lifelong passion. The Venezuelan concessionaires leased or sold their holdings to the highest foreign bidders. Gómez, who didn't trust industrial workers or unions, refused to allow the oil companies to build refineries on Venezuelan soil, so these were built them in the Dutch islands of Aruba and Curaçao. The one in Aruba was for a time the second largest in the world, after the one in Abadan, Iran. Although the Venezuelan oil boom started around 1918, the year when oil first figured as an export commodity, it took off when an oil well called Barroso blew a  spout that threw up an average of the equivalent to 100,000 barrels a day. It took five days to bring the flow under control. By 1927, oil was Venezuela's most valuable export and by 1929 Venezuela exported more oil than any other country in the world.

It has been said that Gómez did not tax the oil companies and that Venezuela did not benefit from oil production, but this is only a half-truth. The Venezuelan government derived considerable income from the concessions and from taxes of one sort of another, but the original fiscal laws which applied to the oil companies were hammered out between the government and American lawyers. The laws were relatively lenient, but Gómez, who had an acute business sense, understood that it was necessary to create incentives for investors in the Venezuelan oil fields, some of which were very accessible but others were deep in jungles. Oil income allowed Gómez to expand Venezuela's rudimentary infrastructure and the overall impact of the oil industry on Venezuela was a modernizing trend in the areas where it operated. But in a wider sense, the Venezuelan people, except for those who worked for the oil companies and lived badly but had a steady income, benefited little or not all from the country's oil riches.

Gómez took power in a very poor illiterate country. The white/pardos social divide was still very much in place. When Gómez died in his bed in 1935, Venezuela was still a poor illiterate country and if anything the social stratification had been accentuated. The population had grown from perhaps one million and a half to two million. Malaria was the greatest killer. Gómez himself probably had Amerindian ancestry, but he was overtly racist and he was much influenced by a historian, Laureano Vallenilla Lanz, who published a book claiming not inaccurately that the Venezuelan War of Independence was really a civil war with the dubious added argument that pardos were a menace to public order and Venezuela could only subsist as a nation ruled by white strongmen. Gómez, for instance, prohibited all immigration from black Caribbean islands. Even though Venezuela's population in his time was 80% pardo, passports, which were first issued under Gómez, identified carriers by the color of skin, which they still did until the 1980s. Venezuela did change considerably under Gómez. It had radio stations in all the important cities. There existed an incipient middle class. But it still had only two or three universities. An estimated 90% of families formed through common-law marriages. The social progress that did take place was through a spontaneous trend towards modernization in which oil played the central role.

López Contreras and Medina Angarita (1935 - 1945) 

Gómez's minister of war, Eleazar López Contreras, succeeded him: a tall, thin, disciplined soldier with a solid education. Before arriving at his post, he served the Gomecista government loyally wherever he was sent, including at one time Venezuela's eastern land's end, a village called Cristobal Colón, across from Trinidad. In power, López Contreras allowed the pardo masses to vent for a few days before clamping down. He had Gómez's properties confiscated by the state, but the dictator's relatives, with some exceptions who left the country, were not harassed. Gómez never married but he had various illegitimate children. Initially, López Contreras permitted political parties to come into the open, but they tended to become rambunctious and he proscribed them, although he did not use strong repressive means (which weren't necessary anyway) as the politicians that led them, called in Venezuelan historiography the "1928 Generation", did not yet have large popular followings. One of the reasons for this hard stance was that, during his first year as president, López Contreras was faced with a labor strike which paralyzed the oil industry in Zulia state in western Venezuela, whose capital was Maracaibo, where the most productive fields were located.

López Contreras had created a labor ministry and his representative there, Carlos Ramírez MacGregor, received orders to make a report of the situation, which confirmed the workers' grievances. He also had instructions to declare the strike illegal, (which he did). Government forces made the workers return to their jobs, although after that incident the oil companies did start taking serious initiatives to improve conditions for Venezuelan workers. Among the notable goals of López Contreras was a campaign to eradicate malaria in the llanos. This task was finally accomplished during the following presidency through the use of DDT.

Two communists led the oil strike: Rodolfo Quintero and the oil worker Jesús Faría. The history of Marxism in Venezuela is rather complex, but a brief overview is that communism never sunk roots in Venezuela and its impact on mainstream politics was minimal. López Contreras tried to create a political movement called Cruzadas Cívicas Bolivarianas (Civic Bolivarian Crusades), but it did not pan out, for whatever he did had the taint of his background as a pillar of the Gómez regime. Even the name "crusades" was suspect with its clerical overtones. Constitutionally, López Contreras finished Gómez's last term and in 1936 he was elected by the docile congress for the term ending in 1941.

After a vote in the same congress for the 1941–1946 term, López Contreras handed power to his war minister and personal friend, the Andean general Isaías Medina Angarita, who in many ways made a strong foil to his predecessor. He was stout and good natured and did not make excessive demands on himself. Medina Angarita legalized all political parties, including the divided communists: some were hard-line, such as the Machado brothers of a traditional Caracas family; and others, gradualists or conciliatory, led by Luis Miquilena, a union leader who supported Medina's step-by-step approach and for a time was allied to one of the Machado brothers. Under Medina there was an indirect democracy, which followed the 19th century custom of elections at the municipal council level. But Medina was committed to a still restricted but wider national democratic election. For that he had officialdom in all the Venezuelan states form a pro-government party named Partido Democratico Venezolana or PDV (Venezuelan Democratic Party). But the real genius at political organization was Rómulo Betancourt, who created from the bottom up what was in effect a pardo party with a strongly reformist, but not Marxist, agenda.

El Trienio Adeco (1945–1948) 

El Trienio Adeco was a three-year period in Venezuelan history, from 1945 to 1948, under the government of the popular party Democratic Action (Accion Democratica, its adherents adecos). The party gained office via the 1945 Venezuelan coup d'état against President Isaías Medina Angarita and held the first elections with universal suffrage in Venezuelan history. The 1947 Venezuelan general election saw Democratic Action formally elected to office, but it was removed from office shortly after in the 1948 Venezuelan coup d'état.

There was no particular incident that set off the bloodless 1948 coup, which was led by Carlos Delgado Chalbaud. There was no popular opposition. This might have meant that the odds were too great or that the general populace had not noticed any particular improvement in their lives despite the incessant government propaganda. All prominent adecos were expelled. The other parties were allowed but muzzled.

1948–1958

Venezuela saw ten years of military dictatorship from 1948 to 1958. After the 1948 Venezuelan coup d'état brought an end to the three-year experiment in democracy ("El Trienio Adeco"), a triumvirate of military personnel controlled the government until 1952, when it held presidential elections. These were free enough to produce results unacceptable to the government, leading them to be falsified and to one of the three leaders, Marcos Pérez Jiménez, assuming the presidency. His government was brought to an end by the 1958 Venezuelan coup d'état, which saw the advent of democracy with a transitional government under Admiral Wolfgang Larrazábal in place until the December 1958 elections. Prior to the elections, three of the main political parties (with the notable exclusion of the Communist Party of Venezuela) signed up to the Punto Fijo Pact power-transition agreement.

1958–1999

Second Andrés Pérez administration 
Serving as president from 1974 to 1979, Carlos Andrés Pérez proved less generous with hand-outs than previously. Despite initially rejecting liberalization policies, his economic agenda was later focused on cutting subsidies, privatizations, and legislation to attract foreign investment. Naím began at the lowest rung of economic liberalization, which was freeing controls on prices and a ten percent increase in that of gasoline, which in Venezuela is sacrosantly very low. The increase in petrol price fed into a 30 percent increase in fares for public transport In February 1989, barely into his second term, Pérez faced a series of widespread protests and lootings, which started in Guarenas and later spread to Caracas, known as El Caracazo. The response resulted in the declaration of a state of emergency and led to a large number of deaths, ranging from the official estimate of 277 dead to over 2000.

The MBR officers started plotting seriously, and on 4 February 1992, they struck. Chávez was a lieutenant-colonel, but generals were involved in the coup attempt. They saw as their first priority the capture Pérez, who had recently returned from a junket. They almost had him cornered in the presidential palace, but he managed to escape to the presidential residence and from there he got loyal troops to corner Chávez in turn and to arrest him. In exchange for prompting his co-conspirators to lay down their arms, Chávez, fully uniformed and unbowed, gained permission to speak on television to the entire nation. This led to quite some discussion after he said his objectives had not yet been reached. Several civilians and military were killed during the uprising.

On 27 November 1992, officers of higher rank than Chávez tried to overthrow Pérez, but on this occasion the authorities suppressed the conspiracy easily. Pérez's downfall came when a legal process was begun to force him to reveal how he had used a secret but legal presidential fund, which he resolutely resisted. With the supreme court and congress ranged against him, Pérez was imprisoned – for a while in a detention center, then later under house arrest. In 1993, Pérez handed over the presidency to Ramón J. Velásquez, an adeco politician/historian who had been his presidential secretary. Though nobody has charged Velásquez with corruption, his son became involved in an illegal pardon for drug traffickers but was not charged. Velázquez oversaw the elections of 1993, and these were at once familiar and unique.

Second Caldera administration

Caldera, who had been candidate for the presidency six times and won once, wanted another go, but COPEI resisted, led by Herrera Campins, and Caldera founded his own brand-new political movement, called Convergencia. COPEI chose a mediocrity from within its ranks. The adecos chose Claudio Fermín. Petkoff had seen the futility of trying again and backed Caldera. Even Velázquez got into the act. When the returns were in, Caldera won and in the process shattered the strict bipolarity thesis. Abstentions reached a record of 40%. The main reason Caldera, who was 76 years old, won was in essence the same as for Pérez's victory in 1973: Everybody knew him, and the middle classes, probably decisive for the only time in Venezuela's history, thought that he could do the miracle that had been expected of Pérez. That is, in some manner to get the country back on track to the "good old times".

Once back in the presidential palace, Caldera confronted the Venezuelan banking crisis of 1994. He re-imposed exchange controls, which Pérez's administration had lifted as part of a general financial liberalization (unaccompanied by effective regulation, which contributed to the banking crisis). The economy had suffered under the falling oil price, which led to a collapse in government revenues. The steel corporation Sidor was privatized, and the economy continued to plummet. Fulfilling an election promise, Caldera released Chávez and pardoned all the military and civilian conspirators during the Pérez regime. The economic crisis continued, and by the 1998 elections the traditional political parties had become extremely unpopular; an initial front-runner for the presidency in late 1997 was Irene Saez. Ultimately, Hugo Chávez Frías was elected president.

1999–present

Chávez and the Bolivarian Revolution
Chávez, a former paratroop lieutenant-colonel who had led an unsuccessful coup d'état in 1992, was elected president in December 1998 on a platform that called for the creation of a "Fifth Republic", a new constitution, a new name ("the Bolivarian Republic of Venezuela"), and a new set of relations between socioeconomic classes. In 1999, voters approved a referendum on a new constitution and in 2000, re-elected Chávez, also placing many members of his Fifth Republic Movement party in the National Assembly. Supporters of Chávez call the process symbolised by him the Bolivarian Revolution and were organised into different government-funded groups, including the Bolivarian Circles.

In April 2002, Chávez was briefly ousted from power in the 2002 Venezuelan coup d'état attempt following actions by some of the military and media and demonstrations by the minority opposition, but he was returned to power after two days as a result of demonstrations by the majority of the public and actions by most of the military.

Chávez also remained in power after a national strike that lasted more than two months in December 2002 – February 2003, including a strike/lockout in the state oil company PDVSA and an August 2004 recall referendum. He was elected for another term in December 2006. In December 2007 in a constitutional referendum, Chávez suffered his first electoral defeat when the voters rejected constitutional changes proposed by the president, some of which would have increased the power of the presidency. The referendum saw a very high level of abstention by the standards of recent polls in Venezuela. However, in February 2009 Chavez called another referendum, proposing the removal of term limits for all elected officials (previously, the constitution limited presidents to two terms, and other officials also had term limits). The referendum took place on 15 February 2009, and was approved.

The 2010 parliamentary elections saw a new opposition electoral coalition, the Coalition for Democratic Unity, win nearly as large a share of the vote as the United Socialist Party of Venezuela (PSUV) but with only 65 seats compared to PSUV's 98. The election was preceded by an electoral reform that favoured PSUV by giving more weight to the countryside. The 2012 presidential elections saw Hugo Chávez re-elected by a substantial margin, but he died in office in early 2013. He was succeeded by Nicolás Maduro (initially as interim president before narrowly winning the 2013 presidential elections).

Nicolás Maduro

First term 
President Nicolás Maduro was formally inaugurated as President of Venezuela on 19 April, after the election commission had promised a full audit of the election results. On 13 May 2013, President Maduro initiated one of his first plans, Plan Patria Segura. A year after the plan was initiated, no changes in crime had been reported since murder rates throughout the country remained the same.

In October 2013, Maduro requested an enabling law to rule by decree in order to fight corruption and to also fight what he called an 'economic war'. On 24 October, he also announced the creation of a new agency, the Vice Ministry of Supreme Happiness, to coordinate all social programmes. In November 2013, weeks before the local elections, President Maduro used his special decree powers and ordered the military to take over appliance stores. Analysts said that the move amounted to a "cannibalizing" of the economy and that it might lead to even more shortages in the future. An article by The Guardian noted that a "significant proportion" of the subsidized basic goods in short supply were being smuggled into Colombia and sold for far higher prices. In February 2014, the government said it had confiscated more than 3,500 tons of contraband on the border with Colombia—food and fuel which, it said, was intended for "smuggling" or "speculation." The president of the National Assembly, Diosdado Cabello, said that the confiscated food should be given to the Venezuelan people, and should not be "in the hands of these gangsters".

Opposition wins parliamentary elections
In the 2015 Venezuelan parliamentary election the opposition gained a majority; however, on 30 March 2017 the Supreme Court of Venezuela (dominated by Maduro loyalists), announced that since the parliament was in contempt of its rulings, the court would assume legislative duties. Whilst the recession which Venezuela entered in 2014 was precipitated by policy failures, a collapse of the price of oil exacerbated the problem. Economic conditions continued to deteriorate in 2016 when consumer prices rose 800% and the gross domestic product contracted by 18.6%, causing hunger to escalate to the point that the "Venezuela's Living Conditions Survey" (ENCOVI) found nearly 75 percent of the population had lost an average of at least 19 pounds in 2016 due to a lack of proper nutrition. Luis Almagro, secretary general of the Organization of American States (OAS) stated, "I have never seen a country going down so fast, at every level: politically, economically, socially".

Following the 2017 Venezuelan constitutional crisis, and the push to ban potential opposition presidential candidate Henrique Capriles from politics for 15 years, protests grew to their most "combative" since they began in 2014.

On 1 May 2017 following a month of protests that resulted in at least 29 dead, Maduro called for a Constituent Assembly that would draft a new constitution that would replace the 1999 Venezuela Constitution. He invoked Article 347, and stated that his call for a new constitution was necessary to counter the actions of the opposition. The members of the Constituent Assembly were not be elected in open elections, but selected from social organizations loyal to Maduro. It would also allow him to stay in power during the interregnum and skip the 2018 presidential elections, as the process would take at least two years.

The opposition started a common front for all the people in Venezuela that oppose the amendment. On 20 June 2017, President of the National Assembly Julio Borges, the opposition-led legislative body of Venezuela, announced the activations of Articles 333 and 350 of the Venezuelan Constitution in order to establish new parallel government.

Constituent Assembly elections were held on 30 July 2017. The decision to hold the election was criticised by members of the international community, with over 40 countries along with supranational bodies such as the European Union, Mercosur and the Organization of American States condemning and failing to recognize the election, stating it would only further escalate tensions. President Maduro's allies  such as Bolivia, Cuba, El Salvador, Nicaragua, Russia and Syria  discouraged foreign intervention in Venezuelan politics and congratulated the president.

The 2017 Constituent Assembly of Venezuela was officially sworn in on 4 August 2017.

On 11 August 2017 US President Donald Trump said that he is "not going to rule out a military option" to confront the autocratic government of Nicolás Maduro and the deepening crisis in Venezuela. Venezuela's Defense Minister Vladimir Padrino immediately criticized Trump for his statement, calling it "an act of supreme extremism" and "an act of madness". The Venezuelan communications minister, Ernesto Villegas, said Trump's words amounted to "an unprecedented threat to national sovereignty".

Second term 
On 20 May 2018, President Nicolás Maduro won the presidential election amidst allegations of massive irregularities by his main rivals. Despite encouragement to resign as president when his first term expired on 10 January 2019, President Maduro was inaugurated by Maikel Moreno, Chief Justice of the Supreme Tribunal of Venezuela. This resulted in widespread condemnation; minutes after taking oath, the Organization of American States approved a resolution in a special session of its Permanent Council in which Maduro was declared illegitimate as President of Venezuela, urging that new elections be summoned. The National Assembly invoked a state of emergency and some nations removed their embassies from Venezuela. With their belief that his election was illegitimate, they claimed that by retaking power, Maduro was converting Venezuela into an illegitimate de facto dictatorship.

Additionally, on 23 January 2019, the president of the National Assembly, Juan Guaidó, was declared the interim president by that body. Guaidó was immediately recognized as the legitimate president by several nations, including the United States and the Lima Group, as well as the Organization of American States. Maduro disputed Guaidó's claim and broke off diplomatic ties with several nations who recognized Guaidó's claim. On 21 February 2019, Nicolás Maduro ordered the closing of his country's border with Brazil. On 23 February, trucks carrying humanitarian aid from Colombia and Brazil attempted to enter Venezuelan territory. Two trucks was set on fire on the Francisco de Paula Santander International Bridge.

Guaidó has been recognized as the acting president of Venezuela by about 60 countries. Internationally, support has followed traditional geopolitical lines, with allies China, Cuba, Iran, Russia, Syria, and Turkey supporting Maduro; while the majority of Western and Latin American countries support Guaidó as acting president. Support for Guaidó has declined since a failed military uprising attempt in April 2019.

Following increased international sanctions throughout 2019, the Maduro government abandoned socialist policies established by Chávez, such as price and currency controls, which resulted in the country seeing a rebound from economic decline. In a November 2019 interview with José Vicente Rangel, President Nicolás Maduro described dollarization as an "escape valve" that helps the recovery of the country, the spread of productive forces in the country and the economy. However, Maduro said that the Venezuelan bolívar will still remain as the national currency.

See also
First Republic of Venezuela
German colonization of the Americas
History of Latin America
History of South America
History of the Americas
List of presidents of Venezuela
Politics of Venezuela
Second Republic of Venezuela
Spanish colonization of the Americas

References

Bibliography

Further reading
 Arroyo Abad, Leticia. "Instability, Cost of Living, and Real Wages in Venezuela in the 19th Century." América Latina en la historia económica 20.3 (2013): 114-137.
 Carroll, Rory. Comandante: Hugo Chávez's Venezuela (Penguin Books, 2014).
 Cromwell, Jesse. The Smugglers' World: Illicit Trade and Atlantic Communities in Eighteenth-century Venezuela (UNC Press Books, 2018).
 Derham, Michael. "Undemocratic democracy: Venezuela and the distorting of history." Bulletin of Latin American Research 21.2 (2002): 270–289.
 Ewell, Judith. Venezuela: a century of change (Stanford UP, 1984).
 Ewell, Judith. Venezuela and the United States: from Monroe's hemisphere to petroleum's empire (U of Georgia Press, 1996).

 Friedman, Elisabeth J. Unfinished Transitions: Women and the Gendered Development of Democracy in Venezuela, 1936-1996 (Penn State Press, 2010).
 Jacobs, Matthew D. "Reformists, revolutionaries, and Kennedy administration public diplomacy in Colombia and Venezuela." Diplomatic History 42.5 (2018): 859-885.
 Layrisse, I. "Heavy oil production in Venezuela: Historical recap and scenarios for next century." in SPE international symposium on oilfield chemistry (Society of Petroleum Engineers, 1999).

 Levine, Daniel H. Religion and Politics in Latin America: The Catholic Church in Venezuela and Columbia (Princeton UP, 1981)
 Lombardi, John V. Venezuela: the search for order, the dream of progress (Oxford UP, 1982).
 Lombardi, John V. People and places in Colonial Venezuela (1976) online

 Mähler, Annegret. "Oil in Venezuela: Triggering conflicts or ensuring stability? A historical comparative analysis." Politics & Policy 39.4 (2011): 583-611.
 Martz, John D. "Party Elites and leadership in Colombia and Venezuela." Journal of Latin American Studies 24.1 (1992): 87-121.
 Moron, Gullermo. A History of Venezuela (1964) online
 Neuhouser, Kevin. "Democratic stability in Venezuela: Elite consensus or class compromise?" American Sociological Review (1992): 117-135. online

 Restuccia, Diego. "The Monetary and Fiscal History of Venezuela: 1960–2016." (University of Chicago, Becker Friedman Institute for Economics Working Paper 2018-59) (2018). online
 Rudolph, Donna Keyse, and Gerald Allen Rudolph. Historical dictionary of Venezuela (Scarecrow Press, 1996).
 Schincariol, Vitor Eduardo. Society and Economy in Venezuela: An Overview of the Bolivarian Period (1998-2018). (2020).
 Smilde, David. Venezuela's Bolivarian Democracy (Duke University Press, 2011).
 Straka, Tomás, Guillermo Guzmán Mirabal, and Alejandro E. Cáceres. Historical Dictionary of Venezuela (Rowman & Littlefield, 2017).
 Tarver, H. Micheal. History of Venezuela, 2nd edition (Greenwood Press, 2018). online
 Wilpert, Gregory. Changing Venezuela by taking power: the history and policies of the Chavez government (2007) online
 Zahler, Reuben. "How Civic Virtue Became Republican Honor: Revolution and Republicanism in Venezuela, 1800–1840." Journal of World History 31.2 (2020): 391-424. excerpt

Historiography
 Lombardi, John V. Venezuelan history: a comprehensive working bibliography (1977) online 530 pages
 Racine, Karen. "Simón Bolívar and friends: Recent biographies of independence figures in Colombia and Venezuela" History Compass 18#3 (Feb 2020) https://doi.org/10.1111/hic3.12608
 Savage, Ritchie. Populist discourse in Venezuela and the United States: American unexceptionalism and political identity formation (Springer, 2018).

External links